West Melbourne (sometimes referred to as Melbourne West) was an electoral district of the Legislative Assembly in the Australian state of Victoria from 1859 to 1904.

The Electoral District of West Melbourne was defined as being bound by the Yarra River on the south, Elizabeth Street on the east, Victoria Street on the north and "the western boundary of the city" by the 1858 Electoral Districts Act.

Members for West Melbourne
Two members initially, one from 1889.

      # = by-election

References

Former electoral districts of Victoria (Australia)
1859 establishments in Australia
1904 disestablishments in Australia